Eric Wertheim (born 1973) is an American naval expert, columnist and author who writes the monthly Combat Fleets of the World column for the Naval Institute's Proceedings magazine.  In 2002 he took over responsibility for compiling the Naval Institute's Combat Fleets of the World, often referred to as the "nation's premier naval reference book".

Bibliography

Naval Institute Guide to Combat Fleets of the World, 2005-06 (2005)
Chronology of the Cold War at Sea (with Norman Polmar, Andrew Bahjat and Bruce Watson) (1998)
Dictionary of Military Abbreviations (with Norman Polmar and Mark Warren) (1994)

See also
Combat Fleets of the World

References

Living people
1973 births
American male writers